Richard A. "Dick" Moccia (born August 9, 1943) is an American politician who is the former mayor of Norwalk, Connecticut. He is a Republican, and was elected in 2005 and served four terms prior to his 2013 Mayoral Election loss to Harry Rilling. Moccia defeated incumbent mayor Alex Knopp by fewer than 200 votes in 2005. In 2019, Moccia ran for First Selectman of Ridgefield, but was not elected. He currently serves on the Ridgefield Board of Finance.

Early life and education 
Moccia was born in Stamford, Connecticut to Bonifacio "Benny" Moccia (1900-1993) and Helen (née Morse; 1906-) Moccia. His father was born in San Mango sul Calore in Campania, Italy and immigrated to the United States in 1922. His father, a machine operator, became a naturalized US citizen in 1934. His mother was born in Rhode Island to Italian parents, the original spelling of her birth name being Elena Morsa, but it was later anglicized to Helen Morse. He had two elder brothers and a sister. 

He graduated from Stamford High School and then studied at Norwalk Community College where he completed an Associate's degree in Liberal Arts and a second one from Sacred Heart University in Paralegal Studies. He also holds a degree in Business Administration from Marywood College.

Political career 
Moccia has served as a member of the Norwalk Common Council, the Fire Commission, the Fair Rent Commission, and the Redistricting Committee. He is a former Constable, City Sheriff and Connecticut State Marshal.

Mayoral Administration 
Mayor Moccia is a member of the Mayors Against Illegal Guns Coalition, an organization formed in 2006 and co-chaired by New York City mayor Michael Bloomberg and Boston mayor Thomas Menino.

Personal life 
On October 3, 1981, Moccia married Barbara A. Vieux (b. 1938), in Norwalk, Connecticut. Since 2014, he has been a resident of Ridgefield, Connecticut. They have four children.

References

American people of Italian descent
Connecticut city council members
Connecticut Republicans
Living people
Marywood University alumni
Mayors of Norwalk, Connecticut
Politicians from Stamford, Connecticut
Sacred Heart University alumni
Year of birth missing (living people)